Hillman Township may refer to one of the following places in the United States:
 Hillman Township, Michigan
 Hillman Township, Kanabec County, Minnesota
 Hillman Township, Morrison County, Minnesota

Township name disambiguation pages